National Road 92 (also known as Tartu-Viljandi-Kilingi-Nõmme maantee; Tartu-Viljandi-Kilingi-Nõmme highway) begins from the outskirts of Tartu from Õssu. The Tartu-Viljandi-Kilingi-Nõmme highway runs along an east–west path in Estonia. The highway ends outside of Kilingi-Nõmme, where it joins the T6.

References

N92